Nicolas Pietrula (born 5 August 1995) is a Czech road and track cyclist. He competed at the 2015 UEC European Track Championships in the team pursuit event and at the 2016 UEC European Track Championships also in the team pursuit event.

Major results

2013
 2nd Time trial, National Junior Road Championships
2014
 1st  Team pursuit, National Track Championships
2016
 3rd Time trial, National Under-23 Road Championships
2017
 National Track Championships
1st  Team pursuit
1st  Individual pursuit
1st  Points race
1st  Omnium
 1st  Time trial, National Under-23 Road Championships
 5th Time trial, National Road Championships
2018
 National Track Championships
1st  Team pursuit
1st  Individual pursuit
 4th Time trial, National Road Championships
2019
 National Track Championships
1st  Team pursuit
1st  Individual pursuit
1st  Points race
2021
 National Track Championships
1st  Scratch
1st  Individual pursuit

References

External links

1995 births
Living people
Czech male cyclists
Czech track cyclists
People from Příbram
European Games competitors for the Czech Republic
Cyclists at the 2019 European Games